Etalemahu Kidane (born 14 February 1983 in Arssi) is an Ethiopian long-distance runner who specializes in the 3000 metres.

She won the Belfast International Cross Country three times consecutively between 2005 and 2007.

International competitions

Personal bests
3000 metres - 8:54.83 min (2003)
5000 metres - 15:04.34 min (2004)

External links

1983 births
Living people
Ethiopian female long-distance runners
Ethiopian female cross country runners
20th-century Ethiopian women
21st-century Ethiopian women